Kildare Dixon Borrowes (21 September 1852 – 19 October 1924) was an English first-class cricketer active 1882 who played for Middlesex. He was born in Exeter; died in Wateringbury.

He was High Sheriff of Kildare in 1902.

References

1852 births
1924 deaths
English cricketers
Middlesex cricketers
Gentlemen of England cricketers
Baronets in the Baronetage of Ireland
High Sheriffs of Kildare
People from Wateringbury